Shane Christie (born 23 September 1985) is a New Zealand rugby union player.

Early career

Born in the city of Palmerston North on New Zealand's North Island, Christie was raised in the town of Nelson, on the northern tip of South Island before moving to Wellington during his schooldays and attending school at Upper Hutt College just outside of Wellington. He headed back to Nelson after school and began working as a builder, a job he would have for 6 years prior to his rugby career really taking off in 2010. During this time, he played rugby for Nelson in Tasman's club rugby competition and also played Heartland Championship rugby with Buller in 2009.

Senior career

Christie first played senior provincial rugby with the Tasman Mako during the 2010 ITM Cup and scored 2 tries in 5 games as the men from Nelson finished 12th out of 14 teams on the log in the final season before the competition was rejigged to feature two divisions of 7 teams. He played all 10 games the following year as the Mako finished last in the Championship.

Christie was again an ever-present, starting in 10 of 11 appearances and scoring 1 try.

Christie played 10 times and scored 1 try which saw him nominated for the ITM Cup Player of the Season award before going on to score 5 tries in 21 games across the 2015 and 2016 seasons as the Makos finished as losing semi-finalists and runners-up respectively.

Super Rugby

After several seasons of hard graft in New Zealand domestic rugby with Tasman, Christie finally earned a Super Rugby contract at the age of 28 with 7 times champions, the  ahead of the 2013 Super Rugby season. Unfortunately, due to fierce competition among a loose forward group that included Richie McCaw, Kieran Read and Matt Todd, he was only able to make a solitary appearance in what was to be his only season in Christchurch.

 2015 was to be a historic season for the franchise as they lifted the Super Rugby title for the first time in their history, defeating the  21–14 in the final. Christie missed a large chunk of the campaign because of a hamstring injury and had to kick his heels on the sidelines as his teammates achieved their success, playing only twice.

The Highlanders were unable to hold on to their Super Rugby crown in 2016, going down to the  42–30 in Johannesburg in the quarter-finals, however a fit again Christie was named as the franchise's co-captain along with All Black Ben Smith and was able to feature 11 times through the year.

Tony Brown replaced the  bound Jamie Joseph as Highlanders head-coach ahead of the 2017 season and he retained Christie in the squad for his first season in charge.

International

Christie represented the All Blacks Sevens twice during the 2010–11 IRB Sevens World Series and has also turned out for the Māori All Blacks since 2012. He received his first call up for the Māori ahead of their UK tour in November 2012 and debuted in a 32–24 defeat to Leicester Tigers on 13 November 2012. He started the match and played the entire 80 minutes before earning a second cap 4 days later as a second-half replacement for Nick Crosswell in a 52-21 demolition of an RFU Championship XV while on 23 November he saw his first action against test match opposition in the shape of  who were overcome 32–19 in Oxford, England. He once again played the whole match in the blindside flanker position.

Christie was again called up by the Māori ahead of their 2014 tour of  but had to withdraw due to injury, so it was after a gap of 3 years before he next pulled on the Black jersey, playing in matches against the US, Munster and Harlequins and scoring his first international try in the 22nd minute of the 26–10 win over Harlequins at Twickenham Stoop.

Career honours

All Blacks Sevens

 IRB Sevens World Series 2010–11

Highlanders

Super Rugby – 2015

Tasman

ITM Cup Championship – 2013

References

Living people
1985 births
New Zealand rugby union players
Rugby union flankers
Māori All Blacks players
Buller rugby union players
Tasman rugby union players
Crusaders (rugby union) players
Rugby union players from Palmerston North
Highlanders (rugby union) players
New Zealand international rugby sevens players
People educated at Upper Hutt College
Te Āti Haunui-a-Pāpārangi people